Poço da Panela is a neighborhood of Recife, Brazil located in the north of the city. It has a land area of 87 hectares, a resident population of 4,006 people and an annual geometric growth rate of 0.45. Adjoining neighborhoods are 'Casa Forte', 'Santana' and 'Monteiro', and it runs along the Capibaribe River. The majority of its residents are upper-middle class, although there are also residents of lower middle class and upper class.

Main streets

 Estrada Real do Poço
 Rua Dona Olegarinha da Cunha
 Rua Luiz Guimarães
 Rua Dos Arcos
 Rua Oliveira Góes
 Rua do Chacon

See also
Recife
Pernambuco
Brazil

References

External links
https://web.archive.org/web/20120531195718/http://www.recife.pe.gov.br/pr/secplanejamento/inforec/midia/03_rpa-poco.jpg

Neighbourhoods of Recife